The Performer is an album by American country music singer and songwriter Marty Robbins (Martin David Robinson, September 26, 1925 – December 8, 1982) released in 1978 by Columbia Records. The album peaked at #47 in the US country chart and #7 in the Canadian country chart. Two singles from the album charted in the country charts, “Please Don’t Play a Love Song” was #17 in both the US and Canada, and “Touch Me With Magic” reached #15 in the US and #18 in Canada. This was his penultimate album issued prior to his death in 1982 and concentrated on country ballads.

Track listing
All tracks composed by Marty Robbins except where indicated
Side 1
"Please Don’t Play a Love Song” (Billy Sherrill, Stephen Davis) – 3:04
"Confused and Lonely" – 2:37
"Look What You’ve Done” (Steve Gibb) – 3:20
"You’re Not Ready For Me Yet" – 3:07
"Another Pack of Cigarettes, Another Glass of Wine" – 3:00

Side 2
"My Elusive Dreams" (Curly Putman, Billy Sherrill) – 3:42
"Jenny" (Gail Davies) – 3:00
"Oh, Regina" – 2:24
"Touch Me With Magic" (Steve Bogard, Mike Utley) – 2:41
"The Performer" – 3:20

 NB: All tracks produced in 1979 except side 1, track 1 and side 2, track 2 both produced in 1978.

Production

Producer: Billy Sherrill
Engineer: Lou Bradley
Recorded at: CBS Recording Studios, Nashville, Tennessee
Background Vocals: The Nashville Edition
Strings arranged by: Bill McElhiney & Bill Justis
Hargus ‘Pig’ Robbins (piano) appeared courtesy of Elektra Records
Album cover photography: Slick Lawson
Album cover design: William J. Johnson/Virginia Team

References

1979 albums
Marty Robbins albums
Columbia Records albums
Albums arranged by Bill Justis
Albums produced by Billy Sherrill